= Merryfield Hall =

Building on the Oregon State University campus in Corvallis, Oregon, U.S.

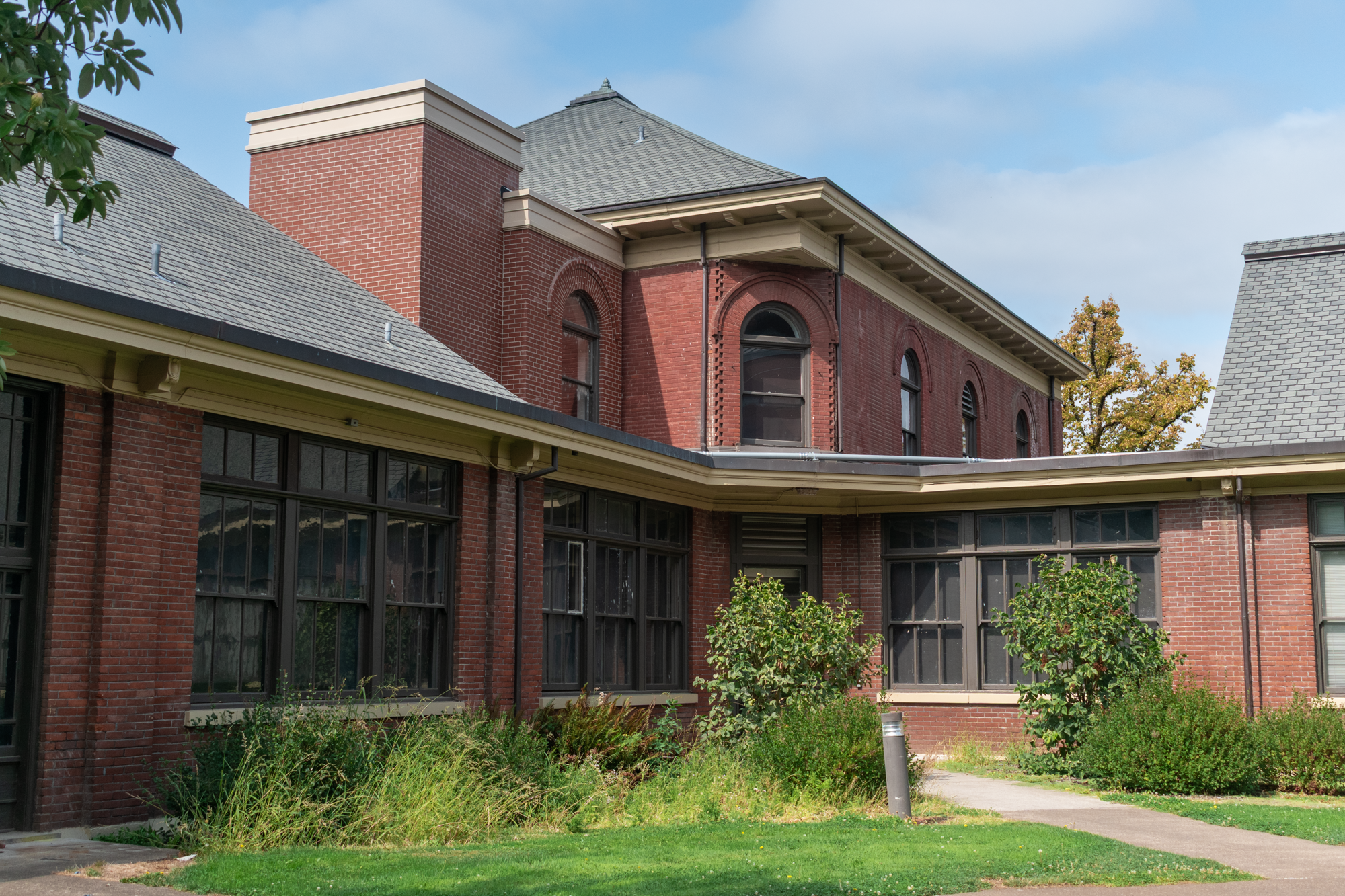
- The building's exterior in 2017
- Interactive map of the Merryfield Hall area

General information
- Coordinates: 44.56753°N 123.27416°W

Merryfield Hall is a building located at 1600 Southwest Monroe Avenue on the Oregon State University campus in Corvallis, Oregon, United States.
